Lot (Lōṭ, lit. "veil" or "covering";  Lṓt;  Lūṭ; Syriac: ܠܘܛ Lōṭ) was a man in the biblical Book of Genesis, chapters 11–14 and 19. Notable events in his life include his journey with his uncle Abram (Abraham); his flight from the destruction of Sodom and Gomorrah, during which Lot's wife became a pillar of salt; and his being intoxicated by his daughters so that they could have sexual intercourse with him and ensure their family would have descendants.

Biblical account

According to the Hebrew Bible, Lot was born to Haran, who died in Ur of the Chaldees. Terah, Lot's grandfather, took Abram (later called Abraham), Lot, and Sarai (later called Sarah) to go into Canaan. They settled at the site called Haran where Terah died.

As a part of the covenant of the pieces, God told Abram to leave his country and his kindred. Abram's nephew Lot joined him on his journey and they went into the land of Canaan, settling in the hills of Bethel.

Due to famine, Abram and Lot journeyed into Egypt, but Abram pretended that his wife Sarai was his sister. Hearing of her beauty, the Pharaoh took Sarai for his own, for which God afflicted him with great plagues. When the Pharaoh confronted Abram, Abram admitted that Sarai had been his wife all along, and so the Pharaoh forced them out of Egypt.

The plain of Jordan

When Abram and Lot returned to the hills of Bethel with their many livestock, their respective herdsmen began to bicker. Abram suggested they part ways and let Lot decide where he would like to settle. Lot saw that the plains of the Jordan were well watered "like the gardens of the Lord, like the land of Egypt," and so settled among the cities of the plain, going as far as Sodom. Likewise, Abram went to dwell in Hebron, staying in the land of Canaan.

The five kingdoms of the plain had become vassal states of an alliance of four eastern kingdoms under the leadership of Chedorlaomer, king of Elam. They served this king for twelve years, but "in the thirteenth year they rebelled." The following year Chedorlaomer's four armies returned and at the Battle of Siddim the kings of Sodom and Gomorrah fell in defeat. Chedorlaomer despoiled the cities and took captives as he departed, including Lot, who dwelt in Sodom.

When Abram heard what had happened to Lot, he led a force of three hundred and eighteen of his trained men and caught up to the armies of the four kings in Dan. Abram divided his forces and pursued them to Hobah. Abram brought back Lot and all of his people and their belongings.

Sodom 

Later, after God had changed Abram's name to Abraham and Sarai's name to Sarah as part of the covenant of the pieces, God and two angels appeared to Abraham in the form of three men. God promised Abraham that Sarah would bear a son and he would become a great and mighty nation. God then tells Abraham his plan,

As the angels continued to walk toward Sodom, Abraham pled to God on behalf of the people of Sodom, where Lot dwelt. God assured him that the city would not be destroyed if fifty righteous people were found there. He continued inquiring, reducing the minimum number for sparing the city to forty five, forty, thirty, twenty, and finally, ten.

Lot's visitors

After supper that night before bedtime, the men of the city, young and old, gathered around Lot's house demanding he bring his two guests out that they might have sex with them. Lot went out, closing the door behind him, and begged them to not do such wicked things. Instead, he offered them his virgin daughters to do with as they please. The men of Sodom accused Lot of acting as a judge and threatened to do worse to him than they would have done to the men.

The angels pulled Lot back in and struck the mob with blindness. The angels said that God had sent them to destroy the place, telling Lot, "whomsoever thou hast in the city; bring them out of the place". Lot went to his sons-in-law's homes and warned them to leave city, but they all thought he was joking.

Lot lingered in the morning so the angels forced him and his family out of the city, telling them to flee for the hills. Scared that they wouldn't be safe in the hills from the impending destruction, Lot instead asked the angels if he may hide and be safe in a nearby village. An angel agreed and the village was then known as Zoar. When God rained sulfur and fire on Sodom and Gomorrah, Lot's wife looks back at them and turned into a pillar of salt.

Instead of both fire and brimstone, Josephus has only lightning as the cause of the fire that destroyed Sodom: "God then cast a thunderbolt upon the city, and set it on fire, with its inhabitants; and laid waste the country with the like burning." In The Jewish War, he likewise says that the city was "burnt by lightning".

Daughters

After the destruction of Sodom and Gomorrah, Lot was afraid to stay in Zoar and so he and his two daughters resettled into the hills, living in a cave. The elder daughter, seeing that there were no men to marry, told the younger that they should instead sleep with their father to continue their lineage. Toward this, they got Lot exceedingly drunk with wine. The elder then laid with her father without his knowing. She insisted the younger do the same, and so the younger did the same to her father the next day. The older daughter conceived Moab (Hebrew מוֹאָב, lit., "from the father" [meh-Av]), father of the Moabites; the younger conceived Ben-Ammi (Hebrew בֶּן-עַמִּי, lit., "Son of my people"), father of the Ammonites.

The story, usually called Lot and his daughters, has been the subject of many paintings over the centuries, and became one of the subjects in the Power of Women group of subjects, warning men against the dangers of succumbing to the temptations of women, while also providing an opportunity for an erotic depiction.  The scene generally shows Lot and his daughters eating and drinking in their mountain refuge.  Often the background contains a small figure of Lot's wife, and in the distance, a burning city.

Religious views

Jewish view
In the Bereshith of the Torah, Lot is first mentioned at the end of the weekly reading portion, Parashat Noach. The weekly reading portions that follow, concerning all of the accounts of Lot's life, are read in the Parashat Lekh Lekha and Parashat Vayera. In the Midrash, a number of additional stories concerning Lot are present, not found in the Tanakh, as follows:
 Abraham took care of Lot after Haran was burned in a gigantic fire in which Nimrod, King of Babylon, tried to kill Abraham.
 While in Egypt, the midrash gives Lot much credit because, despite his desire for wealth, he did not inform Pharaoh of Sarah's secret, that she was Abraham's wife.
According to the Book of Jasher, Paltith, one of Lot's daughters, was burnt alive (in some versions, on a pyre) for giving a poor man bread. Her cries went to the heavens.

Christian view
In the Christian New Testament, Lot is considered sympathetically, as a man who regretted his choice to live in Sodom, where he "vexed his righteous soul from day to day". Jesus spoke of future judgment coming suddenly as in the days of Lot, and warned solemnly, "Remember Lot's wife".

Islamic view

Lut (Arabic: لُوط – Lūṭ) in the Quran is considered to be the same as Lot in the Hebrew Bible. He is considered to be a messenger of God and a prophet of God.

In Islamic tradition, Lut lived in Ur and was a nephew of Ibrahim (Abraham). He migrated with Ibrahim to Canaan and was commissioned as a prophet to the cities of Sodom and Gomorrah. His story is used as a reference by Muslims to demonstrate God's disapproval of homosexuality. He was commanded by Allah to go to the land of Sodom and Gomorrah to preach monotheism and to stop them from their lustful and violent acts. Lut's messages were ignored by the inhabitants, prompting Sodom and Gomorrah's destruction. Though Lut left the city, his wife was asked to be left behind by angels hence died during the destruction.
The Quran defines Lot as a prophet, and holds that all prophets were examples of moral and spiritual rectitude. The Quran does not include stories of Lot's drunkenness and/or incest. All Muslims reject the story of Prophet Lot having intercourse with his daughters.

Modern views 

The presumptive incest between Lot and his daughters has raised many questions, debates, and theories as to what the real motives were, who really was at fault, and the level of bias the author of Genesis Chapter 19 had. However, such biblical scholars as Jacob Milgrom, Victor P. Hamilton, and Calum Carmichael postulate that the Levitical laws could not have been developed the way they were, without controversial issues surrounding the patriarchs of Israel, especially regarding incest. Carmichael even attributes the entire formulation of the Levitical laws to the lives of the founding fathers of the nation, including the righteous Lot (together with Abraham, Jacob, Judah, Moses, and David), who were outstanding figures in Israelite tradition.

According to the scholars mentioned above, the patriarchs of Israel are the key to understanding how the priestly laws concerning incest developed.  Kinship marriages amongst the patriarchs include Abraham's marriage to his half-sister Sarai; the marriage of Abraham's brother, Nahor, to their niece Milcah; Isaac's marriage to Rebekah, his first cousin once removed; Jacob's marriages with two sisters who are his first cousins; and, in the instance of Moses's parents, a marriage between nephew and paternal aunt. Therefore, the patriarchal marriages surely mattered to lawgivers and they suggest a narrative basis for the laws of Leviticus, chapters 18 and 20.

Some have argued that Lot's behavior in offering of his daughters to the men of Sodom in Genesis 19:8 constitutes sexual abuse of his daughters, which created a confusion of kinship roles that was ultimately played out through the incestuous acts in Genesis 19:30–38.

A number of commentators describe the actions of Lot's daughters as rape. Esther Fuchs suggests that the text presents Lot's daughters as the "initiators and perpetrators of the incestuous 'rape'."

See also

 Bani Na'im
 Baucis and Philemon
 Biblical and Quranic narratives
 Lekh-lekha
 Vayeira

References

Bibliography

External links

 Our People: A History of the Jews – Abram and Lot at chabad.org
 
 

 
Ammon
Angelic visionaries
Family of Abraham
Incest in mythology
Lech-Lecha
Moab
Mythological rape victims
Vayeira
Ur of the Chaldees